Shackleton Coast is that portion of the coast along the west side of the Ross Ice Shelf between Cape Selborne and Airdrop Peak at the east side of Beardmore Glacier in Antarctica. Named by New Zealand Antarctic Place-Names Committee (NZ-APC) in 1961 after Sir Ernest Shackleton. He accompanied Scott on the southern journey during the Discovery expedition (1901–04) and subsequently led three Antarctic expeditions. On the British Antarctic Expedition (1907–09), Shackleton discovered the area beyond Shackleton Inlet to the Beardmore Glacier, and was the first to find a practicable route to the South Pole. Lack of food stopped him 97 miles (180 km) from his goal.

Further reading 
 Ute Christina Herzfeld, Atlas of Antarctica: Topographic Maps from Geostatistical Analysis of Satellite Radar Altimeter Data, P 243
 Gunter Faure, Teresa M. Mensing, The Transantarctic Mountains: Rocks, Ice, Meteorites and Water, PP 162, 427, 709

External links 

 Shackleton Coast on USGS website
 Shackleton Coast on the Antarctica New Zealand Digital Asset Manager website
 Shackleton Coast on SCAR website
 Shackleton Coast area satellite image
 Shackleton Coast on "oldmapsonline"

References 

 
Coasts of the Ross Dependency